Glades is an unincorporated community in York County, Pennsylvania, United States.

References

Springettsbury Township, York County, Pennsylvania
Unincorporated communities in York County, Pennsylvania
Unincorporated communities in Pennsylvania